The 1939 Montana Grizzlies football team represented the University of Montana in the 1939 college football season as a member of the Pacific Coast Conference (PCC). The Grizzlies were led by fifth-year head coach Doug Fessenden, played their home games at Dornblaser Field and finished the season with a record of five wins, three losses and one tie (3–6, 1–2 PCC).

Schedule

References

External links
 Montana Grizzlies football – 1939 media guide

Montana
Montana Grizzlies football seasons
Montana Grizzlies football